The 2006 Walsh Cup was a hurling competition played by the teams of Leinster and Ulster. 9 teams competed: 6 Leinster counties, 2 Ulster counties and one third-level college. Lower-level teams competed in the 2006 Kehoe Cup.

Kilkenny won.

Results

Preliminary round

Quarter-finals

Semi-finals

Final

References

Walsh Cup
Walsh Cup (hurling)